The following list includes settlements, geographic features, and political subdivisions of New York whose names are derived from Native American languages.

Listings

Counties

 Allegany County
 Town of Allegany
 Village of Allegany
 Allegany State Park
 Cattaraugus County
 Village of Cattaraugus
 Cattaraugus Creek
 Cayuga County
 Cayuga Lake
 Cayuga Lake (AVA)
 Chautauqua County
 Town of Chautauqua
 Hamlet of Chautauqua
 Chautauqua Lake
 Chemung County
 Town of Chemung
 Chemung River
 Chenango County
 Town of Chenango
 Hamlet of Chenango Forks
 Chenango River
 Erie County
 Lake Erie
 Genesee County
 Town of Genesee
 Town of Genesee Falls
 Genesee River
 Genesee Valley Park
 Niagara County
 City of Niagara Falls
 Niagara Falls
 Niagara Falls State Park
 Town of Niagara
 Fort Niagara
 Niagara Frontier
 Niagara River
 Niagara Gorge
 Niagara Escarpment
 Niagara Escarpment (AVA)
 Oneida County – named after the Oneida people.
 City of Oneida
 Village of Oneida Castle
 Village of Oneida Corners
 Oneida Creek
 Oneida Lake
 Oneida River
 Onondaga County
 City of Onondaga
 Hamlet of Onondaga Hill
 Onondaga Creek
 Onondaga Lake
 Onondaga Lake Park
 Onondaga Park
 Ontario County
 Town of Canandaigua
 City of Canandaigua
 Hamlet of Ontario
 Lake Ontario
 Oswego County
 City of Oswego
 Town of Oswego
 Oswego River
 Otsego County
 Town of Otsego
 Otsego Lake
 Saratoga County
 Town of Saratoga
 City of Saratoga Springs
 Schenectady County
 City of Schenectady
 Schoharie County
 Town of Schoharie
 Village of Schoharie
 Schoharie Creek
 Schoharie Valley
 Seneca County
 Town of Seneca
 Seneca Lake
 Seneca River
 Tioga County
 Town of Tioga
 Tioga River
 Wyoming County
 Village of Wyoming

Settlements

 Apalachin
 Asharoken
 Canajoharie
 Canandaigua
 Canarsie, Brooklyn
 Cassadaga
 Chappaqua
 Cheektowaga
 Commack
 Conesus
 Copake
 Copiague
 Coxsackie
 Cutchogue
 Esopus
 Hannawa Falls
 Irondequoit
 Jamaica
 Kerhonkson
 Kiamesha Lake
 Lackawanna
 Mahopac
 Mamaroneck
 Manhasset
 Manhattan - probably from <man-ǎ-hǎ-tonh>, which seems to reflect Munsee Delaware , "where one gathers bows" (with -/aht/-, "bow").
 Massapequa
 Mattituck
 Merrick
 Montauk
 Napanoch
 Nanuet
 Napeague
 Niskayuna
 Noyack
 Nyack
 Ossining
 Otisco
 Owego
 Patchogue
 Peconic
 Poughkeepsie
 Quiogue
 Quogue
 Ronkonkoma
 Sagaponack
 Schodack
 Setauket
 Shandaken
 Shekomeko
 Skaneateles
 Ticonderoga
 Tuckahoe, Suffolk County
 Tuckahoe, Westchester County
 Waccabuc
 Wappinger
 Wassaic
 Wawarsing
 Wawayanda
 Wyandanch
 Wykagyl
 Yaphank

Bodies of water

 Ashokan Reservoir
 Canandaigua Lake
 Claverack Creek
 Conesus Lake
 Cossayuna Lake
 Hoosic River
 Keuka Lake
 Mongaup River
 Neversink River
 Nissequogue River
 Oatka Creek
 Otisco Lake
 Owasco Lake
 Patchogue River
 Pepacton Reservoir
 Potic Creek
 Queechy Lake
 Sacandaga River
 Saranac River
 Susquehanna River
 Taghkanic Creek
 Taughannock Falls State Park
 Tioughnioga River
 Tonawanda Creek
 Walloomsac River
 Willowemoc Creek

Other

 Adirondack Mountains
 Mohonk Mountain
 Poospatuck Reservation
 Shawangunk Ridge

See also
 List of place names of Native American origin in the United States

References

Citations

Sources
 Beauchamp, William Martin (1906). Aboriginal place names of New York. New York State Education Department, New York State Museum.
 Bright, William (2004). Native American Place Names of the United States. Norman: University of Oklahoma Press.
 Campbell, Lyle (1997). American Indian Languages: The Historical Linguistics of Native America. Oxford: Oxford University Press.

 
Native American origin in New York
 
New York
Placenames